The Battle of Kawmoora, also known as the Kawmoora offensive, was the final military offensive launched by the Tatmadaw (Myanmar Armed Forces) to capture the Karen stronghold of Kawmoora.

For nearly a decade, the Tatmadaw had been unable to capture Kawmoora through Burmese territory, and instead relied on the permission of Thai authorities to launch artillery from Thai territory at enemy positions inside the stronghold. However, after the Fall of Manerplaw, the Tatmadaw was able to advance more soldiers further south and capture Kawmoora on 21 February 1995 after over two months of fighting.

Background 
The Karen people of Kayin State (also known as Karen State) in eastern Myanmar (also known as Burma) are the third largest ethnic group in Myanmar, consisting of 7% of the country's total population, and have fought for independence and self-determination since 1949. The initial aim of the largest Karen opposition group, the Karen National Union (KNU), was to obtain independence for the Karen people. However, in 1976 they instead began to call for a federal union with fair Karen representation, and the self-determination of the Karen people.

Built in 1985, Kawmoora was a Karen stronghold located at a strategic border crossing that controlled minor trade between Myanmar and Thailand. Merchants paid taxes on goods being transported into Myanmar, but during the late 1980s, trade nearly halted due to constant bombardment from the Tatmadaw (Myanmar Armed Forces).

Battle 
This strip of land was dubbed by both sides as "the killing zone", as it became a no man's land littered with corpses of fallen soldiers. Concrete bunkers built by the Karen National Liberation Army (KNLA) guarded the entrance into Kawmoora, which halted infantry offensives by the Tatmadaw. Both sides suffered heavy casualties for over two months before the Tatmadaw was finally able to push into Kawmoora on 21 February 1995.

On 21 February 1995, 10,000 soldiers from the Southeastern Command of the Myanmar Army prepared to make a final advance into Kawmoora. Chinese-manufactured 210 mm breach-loading siege mortars were used to destroy the front-line bunkers of the KNLA, allowing soldiers to enter Kawmoora. This was the first time the Myanmar Army had used those mortars. Kawmoora was captured on the same day and the KNLA retreated to new bases in Myanmar.

Aftermath 
According to the Burmese government, the battle left 131 Burmese soldiers dead, 302 wounded, and two missing, whilst KNLA casualties amounted to 212 killed and 231 wounded. The KNLA, however, claims to have only lost ten soldiers to the battle and "a few dozen wounded". Over its nearly ten-year existence, three foreigners had been killed in Kawmoora: an American, a Belgian, and a Japanese citizen. It has also been alleged that several Chinese military advisors for the Myanmar Army died in Kawmoora.

References

External links 
 Rumble in the Jungle - The Battle of Kawmoora
 Battle of Kawmoora footage 

History of Myanmar (1948–present)
Internal conflict in Myanmar
Karen people
1995 in Myanmar